A Woman's Wit is a 1910 American short silent Western film directed by Joseph A. Golden. It stars Pearl White and Stuart Holmes.

Plot
Bandits kidnap Grace, a judge's daughter, and demand that he orders the release from jail of one of their friends. Grace manages to outwit the gang and sends her horse home, carrying a message in a handkerchief. The message is found by the sheriff and Grace is rescued.

Cast
 Pearl White as Grace Brown
 Stuart Holmes

External links
 

1910 films
1910 Western (genre) films
1910 short films
American black-and-white films
American silent short films
Films directed by Joseph A. Golden
Silent American Western (genre) films
1910s American films